Carmen de Lavallade (born March 6, 1931) is an American actress, choreographer and dancer.

Early life
de Lavallade was born in Los Angeles, California, on March 6, 1931, to Creole parents from New Orleans, Louisiana. She was raised by her aunt, Adele, who owned one of the first African-American history bookshops on Central Avenue. De Lavallade's cousin, Janet Collins, was the first Creole/African descendant prima ballerina at the Metropolitan Opera.

De Lavallade began studying ballet with Melissa Blake at the age of 16. After graduation from Thomas Jefferson High School in Los Angeles, she was awarded a scholarship to study dance with Lester Horton.

Career

De Lavallade became a member of the Lester Horton Dance Theater in 1949 where she danced as a lead dancer until her departure for New York City with Alvin Ailey in 1954. Like all of Horton's students, de Lavallade studied other art forms, including painting, acting, music, set design and costuming, as well as ballet and other forms of modern and ethnic dance. She studied dancing with ballerina Carmelita Maracci and acting with Stella Adler. In 1954, de Lavallade made her Broadway debut partnered with Alvin Ailey in Truman Capote's musical House of Flowers (starring Pearl Bailey).

In 1955, she married dancer/actor Geoffrey Holder, whom she had met while working on House of Flowers. It was with Holder that de Lavallade choreographed her signature solo Come Sunday, to a black spiritual sung by Odetta (then known as Odetta Gordon). The following year, de Lavallade danced as the prima ballerina in Samson and Delilah, and Aida at the Metropolitan Opera.

She made her television debut in John Butler's ballet Flight, and in 1957 she appeared in the television production of Duke Ellington's A Drum Is a Woman. She appeared in several off-Broadway productions, including Othello and Death of a Salesman. An introduction to 20th Century Fox executives by Lena Horne led to more acting roles between 1952 and 1955. She appeared in several films, including Carmen Jones (1954) with Dorothy Dandridge , Odds Against Tomorrow (1959) with Harry Belafonte, and Lone Star (1996).

De Lavallade was a principal guest performer with the Alvin Ailey Dance Company on the company's tour of Asia and in some countries the company was billed as de Lavallade-Ailey American Dance Company. Other performances included dancing with Donald McKayle and appearing in Agnes de Mille's American Ballet Theatre productions of The Four Marys and The Frail Quarry in 1965. At the insistence of friend John Butler, she began teaching at the Yale School of Drama as a choreographer and performer-in-residence in 1970.

She staged musicals, plays and operas, and eventually became a professor and member of the Yale Repertory Theater. Students during this time includes Meryl Streep, Sigourney Weaver, Joe Grifasi, Christopher Durang, and Wendy Wasserstein. Between 1990 and 1993, de Lavallade returned to the Metropolitan Opera as choreographer for Porgy and Bess and Die Meistersinger.

In 2003, de Lavallade appeared in the rotating cast of the off-Broadway staged reading of Wit & Wisdom. In 2010, she appeared in a one-night-only concert semi-staged reading of Evening Primrose by Stephen Sondheim. In 2014 de Lavallade premiered her solo show As I Remember It. The work was a meditation on her history in dance through performance, film, and storytelling.

Personal life
De Lavallade had resided in New York City with her husband Geoffrey Holder until his death on October 5, 2014. Their lives were the subject of the 2005 Linda Atkinson and Nick Doob documentary Carmen and Geoffrey. The couple had one son, Léo. De Lavallade's brother-in-law was Boscoe Holder.

Awards
In 2004, de Lavallade received the Black History Month Lifetime Achievement Award and the Rosie Award (named for Rosetta LeNoire and "given to individuals who demonstrate extraordinary accomplishment and dedication in the theatrical arts and to corporations that work to promote opportunity and diversity"), the Bessie Award in 2006, and the Capezio Dance Award in 2007, as well as an honorary Doctor of Fine Arts degree from the State University of New York through Purchase College in 2006 and Juilliard School in 2008.

In 2016, de Lavallade received the Lifetime Achievement Award at the Obie Awards presented by the American Theatre Wing and The Village Voice for her excellence in off-broadway theater.

In December 2017, she received the Kennedy Center Honors Award. On August 17, 2017, two days after U.S. President Trump's third statement after the 'Charlottesville rally', she announced that she will forgo the related reception at the White House which was later cancelled. Although she did attend the dinner at the State Department hosted by Rex Tillerson and emceed by Julie Andrews.

De Lavallade was a The New Jewish Home's Eight over Eighty Gala 2017 honoree.

References

External links

https://m.imdb.com/name/nm0209596
 Carmen de Lavallade's oral history video excerpts at The National Visionary Leadership Project; accessed October 7, 2014.
Archive film of Carmen de Lavallade performing Portrait of Billie in 1992 at Jacob's Pillow; accessed January 17, 2015.
Archival footage of Carmen de Lavallade discussing her involvement in the "Dances for an iPhone" project at Jacob's Pillow, July 23, 2011; accessed October 7, 2014.
Elizabeth Blair, "At 83, Dancer Carmen De Lavallade Looks Back At A Life Spent Onstage", NPR, October 28, 2014.
 
Stuart A. Rose Manuscript, Archives, and Rare Book Library, Emory University: Geoffrey Holder and Carmen De Lavallade papers, circa 1900–2018

1931 births
Actresses from Los Angeles
African-American ballet dancers
African-American female dancers
American ballerinas
American choreographers
American female dancers
American film actresses
American musical theatre actresses
Dancers from California
Kennedy Center honorees
Living people
Louisiana Creole people
Modern dancers
Actresses from New York City
Dancers from New York (state)
Yale School of Drama faculty
20th-century African-American women singers
21st-century African-American people
21st-century African-American women
e